John Archibald (born April 1963) is a Pulitzer Prize-winning journalist and columnist for the Birmingham News, The Huntsville Times, and the Press-Register. He graduated from the University of Alabama in 1986 and began work as a reporter for the Birmingham News. John  began writing his column in 2004, where he focuses on Alabama and Birmingham politics. In 2018, John Archibald was awarded the Pulitzer Prize for Commentary, "for lyrical and courageous commentary that is rooted in Alabama but has a national resonance".

John Archibald is the son of Methodist minister Robert L. Archibald Jr. His family lived across north Alabama when he was young, in Alabaster, Huntsville, Jacksonville and Decatur. His family moved to Birmingham, where John graduated from Banks High School. John completed a bachelor's degree in journalism at the University of Alabama in 1986.

Archibald's book, Shaking the Gates of Hell is to be published by Alfred A. Knopf in March 2021. 
In 2020 he was awarded a Nieman Foundation fellowship at Harvard University in order to study how media stories shape public perceptions of crime and a "culture of fear".

Archibald and his wife, Alecia have three children: Drew, Ramsey and Mamie. Ramsey also writes for the Alabama Media Group as a data reporter and columnist.

Publications
 Archibald, John (2021) Shaking the Gates of Hell: A Search for Family and Truth in the Wake of the Civil Rights Revolution Knopf.

References 

Living people
American male journalists
Journalists from Alabama
Pulitzer Prize for Commentary winners
1963 births
Writers from Alabama
Writers from Birmingham, Alabama